The Honda e is a battery electric supermini manufactured by Japanese automaker Honda, available in the European and Japanese markets in 2020. It is based on the Urban EV Concept presented at the 2017 International Motor Show Germany in September 2017. The production version was unveiled at the same show in 2019. Unlike the layout of the Urban EV Concept, which was a 3-door hatchback, the production version is available only as a 5-door model. Its name was confirmed by Honda in May 2019. The vehicle is styled with a retro look reminiscent of the first-generation Civic. Honda's stated goal is to solely offer electrified powertrains in all of its mainstream European models by 2022.

History 

The Urban EV Concept, first shown in 2017, was styled by Yuki Terai (exterior) and Fumihiro Yaguchi (interior) to evoke friendly and comforting feelings in prospective owners. Press coverage of the Urban EV Concept's styling called it "an adorable homage to some of Honda's first small cars, such as the diminutive Civic hatchbacks of the 1970s" and compared it to other urban cars originally introduced in the 1970s and early 1980s, including the Volkswagen Golf and Polo, Peugeot 205, Fiat 126 and 127, and the Honda's N600, pointing out similarities to the styling of the concept vehicle's predecessor, the EV-N concept.

The pre-production car (named the Honda e) had its world debut at the Geneva Motor Show in March 2019. Its styling is an evolution of the 2017 Urban EV Concept; Honda equipped the 2019 prototype with flush-mounted door handles and compact rear-view cameras on each side to simplify its profile. To facilitate charging from either side, the charging port is located in the middle of the car's bonnet (hood). The final production version of the e made its world debut at IAA 2019 in September 2019, held in Frankfurt, Germany.

Delivery is scheduled to begin in summer 2020.

Design

The e project was led by Kohei Hitomi; the exterior styling team was led by Ken Sahara and the interior styling team was led by Akinori Myoui.

According to Hitomi, the e faced significant resistance from within the company; other executives, concerned about the vehicle's range, argued that a larger battery was needed, but the project team insisted on using a smaller battery to complement the vehicle's small size and urban use. The positive feedback from the Urban EV Concept led to the approval of the production car.

Chassis
It uses a dedicated rear-motor, rear-wheel-drive electric vehicle platform, to facilitate agility and compact proportions for its planned urban market. The water-cooled battery pack is carried within the wheelbase of the car, below the floor to provide a 50/50 weight distribution and a low centre of gravity. Driving the rear wheels eliminates torque steer. Agility is aided by torque vectoring. The platform features MacPherson strut independent suspension for each wheel.

Powertrain 

The e features an electric motor at the rear, offering a power output of either ; both variants offer  of torque. The e offers a 'Sport Mode' to sharpen acceleration response and can be driven in 'Single Pedal Control' mode, where releasing the accelerator will engage the regenerative braking system, slowing the car without using a separate brake pedal. Rumours of a potential higher-performance variant were quashed at the car's debut in Frankfurt.

The e is equipped with a CCS Combo 2 connector, enabling both AC charging and DC fast charging. With DC fast charging, the car can be charged to 80% capacity in 30 minutes. Honda has also announced the pending availability of its Power Charger, which allows a charging power of up to 7.4kW (single-phase). Three-phase charging (22kW) is not available. With a 7.4kW charger, the vehicle will charge to 100% capacity in approximately 4 hours.

Features 

The instrument panel, which extends the full width of the interior, consists of five screens, including one dedicated  instrument display in front of the driver and two large  infotainment touchscreen displays flanked by two smaller  displays for what Honda calls its Side Camera Mirror System. The dual infotainment displays can independently run separate applications and are swappable; they support both Android Auto and Apple CarPlay. The car is equipped with the Honda Personal Assistant, which uses machine learning to train its voice recognition; voice commands to the car are prefixed with "OK Honda".

Safety

Euro NCAP
The Honda e in its standard European configuration received 4 stars from Euro NCAP in 2020.

Reception
Reception, in general, has been positive because of its retro styling and the mix of design and functionality. However, it was criticized for its limited range and high price.

Starting on 20 May 2019, customers in the UK and selected European markets: Germany, France and Norway, could place an order with an £800 (or equivalent) refundable deposit and Honda received over 25,000 expressions of interest across Europe, of which 6,500 came from the UK. By September, Honda received 40,000 expressions of interest.

Reviewing the e Prototype for Car, Jake Groves wrote that it demonstrated "how electric cars should drive" with a caveat that the test drive took place on a test track in Germany. The "low-ish available range and expected-to-be-lofty price tag" were expected to put the car at a disadvantage compared to entry-level EV rivals such as the Tesla Model 3, Nissan Leaf, Hyundai Kona Electric, and Kia e-Niro. James Attwood, reviewing for Autocar, wrote the e Prototype has "nimble handling that fits its credentials as a versatile urban runaround — while offering the sort of fun driving response that should keep anyone already won over by the car's style happy."

Awards
The Honda e won "Red Dot: Best of the Best 2020" in the automobile category. It was named the overall "German Car of the Year" for 2021, becoming the first Japanese car to win the award. At the 2021 World Car Awards, it won the "World Urban Car of the Year" award.

Sales 
Honda expects to sell around 1,000 units annually in the Japanese market, and around 10,000 units annually in the European market. The car will not be sold in the US market.

See also
 Honda Clarity, Honda's electric and fuel cell vehicle family in North America and Japan.
Honda EV Plus, Honda's late 1990s subcompact EV

References

External links 

 
 

e
Cars introduced in 2020
Subcompact cars
Hatchbacks
Rear-wheel-drive vehicles
Euro NCAP small family cars
Production electric cars
Retro-style automobiles